Digital hardcore is a fusion genre that combines hardcore punk with electronic dance music genres such as breakbeat, techno, and drum and bass while also drawing on heavy metal and noise music. It typically features fast tempos and aggressive sound samples. The style was pioneered by Alec Empire of the German band Atari Teenage Riot during the early 1990s, and often has sociological or far-left lyrical themes.

Characteristics

Digital hardcore music is typically fast and abrasive, combining the speed, heaviness and attitude of hardcore punk, thrash metal, and riot grrrl with electronic music such as hardcore techno, gabber, jungle, drum and bass, glitch, and industrial rock. Some bands, like Atari Teenage Riot, incorporate elements of hip-hop music, such as freestyle rap.

According to Jeff Terich of Treble Media, digital hardcore is "on the verge of reaching speeds incompatible with popular music, as if the rapid acceleration of BPMs would render the idea of rhythm irrelevant or, at the very least, unpredictable. Maybe this is music for dancing; definitely this is music for screaming and breaking things."

The electric guitar (either real or sampled and usually heavily distorted) is used alongside samplers, synthesizers and drum machines. While the use of electronic instruments is a defining feature of the genre, bass guitars, electric guitars, and drum kits are optional. Vocals are more often shouted than sung by more than one member of the group. Typically, the lyrics are highly politicized and espouse left-wing or anarchist ideals. Some practitioners have been influenced by anarcho-punk.

History

1990s

The music was first defined by the band Atari Teenage Riot, who formed in Berlin, Germany in 1992. The band's frontman, Alec Empire, coined the term "digital hardcore," setting up the independent record label Digital Hardcore Recordings in 1994. German bands with a similar style began signing to the label and its underground popularity grew, with small digital hardcore festivals being held in several German cities. By the mid-1990s, a number of new record labels specializing in the genre were formed around the world. These included Gangster Toons Industries (Paris), Praxis (London), Cross Fade Enter Tainment (Hamburg), Drop Bass Network (U.S.), and Bloody Fist (Australia). Digital Hardcore Recordings also had some kinship with the Frankfurt labels Mille Plateaux and Riot Beats. Alec Empire's work subsequently set the template for breakcore.

Other prominent digital hardcore musicians of this period include Christoph de Babalon, Cobra Killer, Sonic Subjunkies, EC8OR, Hanin Elias, Lolita Storm, Nic Endo, The Panacea, and The Mad Capsule Markets.

2000s
In Alec Empire's words, "Digital Hardcore went from a local, Berlin based scene to an international underground movement." The soundtrack to the film Threat included contributions from digital hardcore musicians, along with metalcore bands. James Plotkin, Dave Witte and Speedranch's project Phantomsmasher combined digital hardcore with grindcore. Notable 21st century digital hardcore groups include Left Spine Down, Motormark, Death Spells, The Shizit, Rabbit Junk, and Fear, and Loathing in Las Vegas.

2010s–2020s
Digital hardcore saw less prominence in the 2010s. However, its international influence can be seen in the prominence of electronicore, a similar musical genre fusing hardcore punk and metalcore with electronica. The German band We Butter the Bread with Butter has seen commercial success employing this fusion. The term "digital hardcore" has largely fallen out of use, given its association with politically charged lyrics, which are not a characteristic of newer electronicore artists.

See also
Digital Hardcore Recordings
Breakcore
Electronicore
Electropunk
Cybergrind
Industrial metal

References

Bibliography
 Reynolds, Simon (1999). Generation Ecstasy: Into the World of Techno and Rave Culture. Routledge. 
 Taylor, Steve (2006). The A to X of Alternative Music. Continuum International Publishing Group. 

20th-century music genres
21st-century music genres
Hardcore punk genres
Hardcore music genres